Stadium MUDr. Ivan Chodák is a home football stadium in Dolný Kubín, Slovakia. It serves as home stadium for football club MFK Dolný Kubín. The stadium has a capacity of 1,950 (730 seats).  In 2009, has hosted match of Slovak Super Cup, between ŠK Slovan Bratislava and MFK Košice.

External links 
Stadium website 

Football venues in Slovakia
Buildings and structures in Žilina Region